Teenage Riot may refer to:

 "Teen Age Riot", a 1988 single by Sonic Youth, the opening track from their fifth studio album Daydream Nation
 "Teenage Riot", a song by the Ataris from their 2001 album End Is Forever
 "Teenage Riot", a double A-side single with the song "Flamingo" by Kenshi Yonezu
 Atari Teenage Riot, a German band